Greece had the highest rate of male smokers in Europe in 2015: 53%.

See also 
Healthcare in Greece
Smoking in Greece
Obesity in Greece

References